Roya Nonahali (born February 13, 1963) is an Iranian actress and director. She studied painting, and has worked in theatre since 1984. Nonahali started film acting with The Beloved Is at Home (1987, by Khosrow Sinai). Then she was selected by Mohsen Makhmalbaf for Marriage of the Blessed and received an award from Fajr International Film Festival. Her performance in Smell of Camphor, Fragrance of Jasmine was awarded with the Best Supporting Actress award at the festival. She started acting in TV programs by Asleep & Awake in 2001. In 2019 she referee's in first Iranian Talent Show called Asre Jadid produced by Ehsan Alikhani.

Filmography 

 The Imperfect Man, 1992
 The Fifth Season, 1996
 Smell of Camphor, Scent of Jasmine (directed by Bahman Farmanara), 2000
 Women's Prison, 2002
 The House Built on Water, 2002
 A Piece of Bread (Yek Tekke Nan, directed by Kamal Tabrizi), 2005
 Niloofar, (directed by Sabine El Gemayel), 2008
 It Happened at Midnight, 2016
 Shirin, 2008
 Helen, 2017
 Shahrzad, 2017
 The Waltz of Grey Years, 2020
 Queen of Beggars (TV series), 2021

TV Show 
 Asre Jadid (season 1) 2019
 Asre Jadid 2020-present

References

External links

 
 

Living people
1964 births
People from Nur, Iran
Iranian film actresses
University of Tehran alumni
Iranian television actresses
20th-century Iranian actresses
Crystal Simorgh for Best Actress winners
Crystal Simorgh for Best Supporting Actress winners